The MEAC men's basketball tournament (popularly known as the MEAC tournament) is the conference championship tournament in basketball for the Mid-Eastern Athletic Conference (MEAC). The tournament has been held every year since 1972. It is a single-elimination tournament and seeding is based on regular season records. The winner, declared conference champion, receives the conference's automatic bid to the NCAA men's basketball tournament.

Results

* Overtime

Tournament championships by school

Television coverage

See also
 MEAC women's basketball tournament

References

External links 
 MEACHoops.com – Official web site

 
Recurring sporting events established in 1972